The Guadalcanal honeyeater (Guadalcanaria inexpectata) is a species of bird in the family Meliphagidae. It is monotypic within the genus Guadalcanaria. It is endemic to Guadalcanal in the Solomon Islands, where it is found high in montane forest.

References

Guadalcanal honeyeater
Birds of Guadalcanal
Endemic fauna of the Solomon Islands
Guadalcanal honeyeater
Taxonomy articles created by Polbot
Endemic birds of the Solomon Islands